Omoadiphas texiguatensis is a species of snake in the family Dipsadidae.

It is found in the mountain range Cordillera Nombre de Dios of Yoro Department, Honduras.

References

Original publications
 McCranie & Castañeda, 2004 : A new species of snake of the genus Omoadiphas (Reptilia: Squamata: Colubridae) from the Cordillera Nombre de Dios in northern Honduras. Proceedings of the Biological Society of Washington,  (archive).

Omoadiphas
Snakes of Central America
Endemic fauna of Honduras
Reptiles of Honduras
Reptiles described in 2004